Elliot Moss is a multi-instrumentalist songwriter, producer, and visual artist from New York City. He slowly released multiple singles from his debut album Highspeeds, released in 2015, including tracks like "Big Bad Wolf", "Slip" and "Highspeeds", which was played, recorded, and mixed primarily by himself. Moss worked on this specific album since his sophomore year of high school.

In 2014, Moss started booking shows with his five-man band, covering material from both Highspeeds and songs from a new album scheduled for release in 2015. Moss has played in support of Cold War Kids, Digitalism, and Nada Surf, and has performed at venues such as CMJ, Music Hall of Williamsburg, and he played at SXSW in March 2015.

Sean Moeller's Paste magazine review of the 2014 CMJ fest called Moss "as great as I wanted him to be," and New Music Nashville described his music as "smooth-as-they-come alternative electronic beats."

Hilly Dilly said that the song "just might be the very definition of a hidden gem," and The Musicality described the song as the "definition of a gem. The electro effects on his voice and the dark synths combine to make a track that is a laid back, slow jam with elements of cool jazz."

In 2014, his music was featured in an episode of the MTV series Finding Carter. In October 2014, Moss signed with the booking company AM Only.

In 2020, "99" was featured in STARZ popular TV show, 'Power Book II: Ghost', Season 1, Episode 2, Exceeding Expectations. '99' plays during Ghost’s funeral scene. It reached Top 50 on SHAZAM following the episode.

In 2021, "Slip" was featured in popular Netflix show, Elite.

Discography

Albums
Highspeeds (Original Release: October 15, 2013; Re-Released under Grand Jury Music Records: 2015)

Boomerang (2017)

A Change in Diet (2020)

Singles 
 "Big Bad Wolf" (2013)
 "Slip" (2013)
 "Without the Lights" (2016)
 "Closedloop" (2017)
 "Barricade" (2019)
 "Bodyintoshapes" (2020)

References

External links
 

Musicians from New York City
Year of birth missing (living people)
Living people